Nicole Melichar and Anna Smith were the defending champions, but Smith chose to compete in Strasbourg instead. Melichar played alongside Květa Peschke, but lost in the semifinals to Demi Schuurs and Katarina Srebotnik.

Schuurs and Srebotnik went on to win the title, defeating Kirsten Flipkens and Johanna Larsson in the final, 3–6, 6–3, [10–7].

Seeds

Draw

Draw

References
 Main Draw

Nurnberger Versicherungscupandnbsp;- Doubles
2018 Doubles
Nurnberger Versicherungscupandnbsp;- Doubles